Edgar J. Fredricks (June 27, 1942 – March 31, 2016) was a Republican member of the Michigan Legislature from 1975 through 1990.

Fredricks was an aide to Congressman Guy Vander Jagt, and was executive director of President Richard Nixon's Michigan campaign in 1968.

Fredricks unsuccessfully challenged Fred Upton in the primary for Congress in 1990.

References

Calvin University alumni
Western Michigan University alumni
2016 deaths
1942 births
Republican Party members of the Michigan House of Representatives
Republican Party Michigan state senators
20th-century American politicians